The following are the list of Indonesian diplomats that served as Permanent Representative of the Republic of Indonesia to the United Nations:

 Lambertus Nicodemus Palar, 1950–1953
 Sudjarwo Tjondronegoro, 1953–1957
 Ali Sastroamidjojo, 1957–1960
 Sukarjo Wiryopranoto, 1960–1962
 Lambertus Nicodemus Palar, 1962–1965
 Ruslan Abdulgani, 1967–1971
 Chaidir Anwar Sani, 1971–1979
 Abdullah Kamil, 1979–1982
 Ali Alatas, 1982–1988
 Nana Sutresna, 1988–1992
 Nugroho Wisnumurti, 1992–1997
 Makarim Wibisono, 1997–2001
 Makmur Widodo, 2001–2004
 Rezlan Ishar Jenie, 2004–2007
 Marty Natalegawa, 2007–2009
 Hassan Kleib, 2010–2011
 Desra Percaya, 2012–2015
 Dian Triansyah Djani, 2016–2021
 Arrmanatha Nasir, 2021–present

See also
Indonesia and the United Nations
Foreign relations of Indonesia

External links
Mission of the Republic of Indonesia to United Nations

 
United Nations
Indonesia